Joseph Alexander Bell (November 27, 1923 – February 17, 2014) was a Canadian professional ice hockey player who played 62 games in the National Hockey League.  He played with the New York Rangers. He was born in Portage la Prairie, Manitoba. His brother Gordie Bell also played in the NHL. Bell died in February 2014, at the age of 90.

Awards and achievements
MJHL Goal Scoring Leader (1942)
Turnbull Cup (MJHL) Championship (1942)
Memorial Cup Championship (1942)
AHL First All-Star Team (1946)
AHL Goal Scoring Leader (1946)
USHL Second All-Star Team (1949)
PCHL First All-Star Team (1951)
PCHL Goal Scoring Leader (1951)
WIHL Scoring Champion (1955)
"Honoured Member" of the Manitoba Hockey Hall of Fame

References

External links

1923 births
2014 deaths
Canadian ice hockey left wingers
Sportspeople from Portage la Prairie
New York Rangers players
Portage Terriers players
Seattle Ironmen players
Ice hockey people from Manitoba
Canadian expatriate ice hockey players in the United States